Carabus albrechti is a species of either black or brown coloured ground beetle in the subfamily Carabinae that is endemic to Japan.

Subspecies
The species have 11 subspecies all of which could be found in Japan:
Carabus albrechti albrechti Morawitz, 1862
Carabus albrechti awashimae Ishikawa & Takami, 1996
Carabus albrechti echigo Ishikawa & Takami, 1996
Carabus albrechti esakianus Nakane, 1961
Carabus albrechti freyi van Emden, 1932
Carabus albrechti hagai Takami & Ishikawa, 1997
Carabus albrechti hidakanus Ishikawa & Takami, 1996
Carabus albrechti itoi Ishikawa & Takami, 1996
Carabus albrechti okumurai (Ishikawa, 1966)
Carabus albrechti tohokuensis (Ishikawa, 1984)
Carabus albrechti tsukubanus Takami & Ishikawa, 1997

References

albrechti
Beetles described in 1862
Endemic fauna of Japan